All I Have is the debut studio album by American R&B recording artist Amerie. It was released on July 30, 2002, through Columbia Records, Rise Entertainment and Richcraft Records. Entirely produced by Rich Harrison, the album debuted and peaked at number nine on the US Billboard 200 chart in August 2002, remaining in the top twenty for two weeks only and dropping off the top hundred in its fourteenth week. It also received generally mixed reviews from the music critics. Nevertheless, the album was certified Gold by the Recording Industry Association of America (RIAA) for selling over 500,000 copies on October 3, 2003, and won Amerie a Soul Train Music Award for Best R&B/Soul or Rap New Artist in 2003. According to Nielsen SoundScan, the album has sold over 661,000 copies in the United States as of July 2009. All I Have produced two singles: "Why Don't We Fall in Love" (which peaked at number 23 on the US Billboard Hot 100) and a minor hit "Talkin' to Me".

Background
While studying at Georgetown, Amerie befriended a Washington, D.C., club promoter who put her in touch with producer Rich Harrison. During an interview with Maxim, Amerie said she met up with Harrison at a McDonald's parking lot, and performed a song for him in her car. Rich Harrison—who had just worked on Mary J. Blige's albums Mary and No More Drama—began developing demos with Amerie. This led to her first record deal with Harrison's Richcraft Entertainment, in collaboration with Columbia Records. According to Amerie, she and Harrison immediately hit it off. In a 2002 interview, she commented "For some reason we had a very special chemistry. When we would work together something great would happen."

Amerie recorded the chorus for the 2001 single "Rule", performed by Nas. The single peaked at number 67 on the Hot R&B/Hip-Hop Singles & Tracks chart in the United States. She also recorded a song with Detroit rapper Royce da 5'9", titled "Life", the third and final single from his Rock City (Version 2.0) album.

Release and promotion
All I Have was first released in United States, for CD and vinyl LP, on July 30, 2002, through Columbia Records, Rise Entertainment and Richcraft Records. It was released on August 5, 2002, in Europe through Sony Music Entertainment. It was also released in Japan, on November 20, 2002, through Sony Music Entertainment Japan.

In April 2002, Amerie's debut single, "Why Don't We Fall in Love", was released, peaking at number 23 on the Billboard Hot 100 and becoming a top ten hit on the US Hot R&B/Hip-Hop Songs and Hot Dance Club Play charts. The song was an urban top twenty hit in Australia and reached the top 40 in the United Kingdom. 
To promote the album, Amerie went on tour with Usher and Nas, traveling on Usher's Evolution 8701 Tour in 2002. Amerie also promoted the album by touring with rapper Nelly, performing on twelve of his concert dates. The second and final single from All I Have was "Talkin' to Me", a top twenty entry on the Hot R&B/Hip-Hop Songs, although it peaked outside the top forty on the Billboard Hot 100.

Critical reception

All I Have received generally mixed reviews from music critics. William Ruhlmann of AllMusic gave the album the grade of two and a half out of five stars, stating: "The debut album by 22-year-old Amerie is basically a showcase for writer/producer Rich Harrison, who constructs a series of mid-tempo rhythm tracks and writes lyrics of romantic longing. Harrison's lack of originality is suggested by his inability even to come up with new song titles. Among the tracks here are newly written songs entitled "Need You Tonight" "Got to Be There" and even "I Just Died" (that's right, "in your arms"). Amerie has a pleasant-enough voice that she uses to express a tempered fervor and a degree of eroticism, but she seems to be just another modestly talented performer chosen mostly for her looks; record companies seem to be on an endless search for attractive young women of mixed racial heritage (apparently in hopes of demographic crossover) who can carry a tune, and this willing Georgetown graduate with a Korean mother and African-American father is just the latest in a long line. None of which is to say that she won't succeed (record companies make a lot of money taking such bets), but at least on the basis of her debut album, Amerie has nothing to recommend her beyond a fairly anonymous surface appeal."

Vanessa E. Jones of The Boston Globe gave a mixed review, stating: Amerie's almond eyes come courtesy of her Korean mother, while her caramel skin was inherited from her African-American dad. On her debut CD, All I Have, she proves that the melange makes a soulful combination. If there was a representative sound of the summer this year, it should have been the singer's shimmering single, "Why Don't We Fall in Love". With jazzy horns and romantic strings caressed by Amerie's strong, yearning alto, the song brought to mind beach holidays and summer fun every time it came on the air. Amerie follows up that effort with a 12-song CD with several distinctive cuts. It would be a great debut if it weren't for all the filler, and for lyrics (written by the CD's producer Rich Harrison) that revolve around the tired subjects of love, betrayal, and hate. When Amerie fails to follow her instincts, the results can be disastrous. "Float", for instance, finds her relying on histrionic yelling rather than crooning. But this is definitely a talent to watch, as the songs "Can't Let Go", "Talkin' to Me", "Got to Be There" and "Why Don't We Fall in Love" show."

Sarah Rodman of Boston Herald gave the album positive review with the grade of three out of four stars, stating: "This 22-year-old Georgetown grad may be blessed with a lovely, flinty voice and great looks, but even she must have been shocked when her debut album, All I Have, made a Top 5 debut in Billboard. Amerie's music is two parts intriguing (a strong yet sultry R&B growl matched with the off-kilter hip-hop grooves of producer Rich Harrison) and one part run-of-the-mill (banal romance lyrics). There are tunes about Mr. Right, Mr. Right Now and Mr. Wrong. Amerie scores extra points for keeping things short, sweet and free from gratuitous vocal acrobatics. She stands out from the female R&B pack without resorting to affectation or gimmickry." Steve Jones of USA Today gave the album two and a half out of four stars, stating: "On her strings-laced hit single, "Why Don't We Fall in Love", 22-year-old Amerie shows a talent for subtlety and nuance not often heard from a debut singer. The sultry vocalist lets the intensity build rather than relying on over-the-top flourishes. She shows her versatility with the jazzy "Nothing Like Loving You", the edgy "I Just Died" and the infectious "Talkin' to Me". While the material is not consistently strong, it serves as a nice introduction to a singer with great potential for growth."

Felicia Pride from PopMatters gave a mixed review, stating: "Even with all her charming characteristics, the brains, the voice and the looks, her debut is, well, boring... The tracks run into each other to the point that they become one very long song... The songs that really carry the album are "I Just Died" and "Show Me". Both are quiet storm ballads in which her vocals are richer, not as forced (quieter) and dance hand-in-hand with sexy hooks that allow the track to take the lead... The ingredients are there, she just needs to perfect the mix."

Commercial performance
The album debuted and peaked at number nine on the US Billboard 200 chart in August 2002, remaining in the top 20 for two weeks only and dropping off the chart in its fourteenth week. The album was certified Gold by the Recording Industry Association of America on October 3, 2003, and earned Amerie a Soul Train Music Award for Best R&B/Soul or Rap New Artist in 2003. According to Nielsen SoundScan, as of July 2009, the album has sold 661,000 copies in the United States. It peaked at number one on the US Top R&B/Hip-Hop Albums chart by Billboard. It was also minor success in Japan, peaking at number 181 on the Oricon albums chart.

Track listing 

Sample credits
 "Why Don't We Fall in Love" and its remixes contain a sample of "Condor! (Theme)/I Got You Where I Want You", as performed by Dave Grusin from the soundtrack to the 1975 film Three Days of the Condor
 "Need You Tonight" contains a sample of "Synthesizers Dance", as performed by Miroslav Vitouš from the 1976 album Magical Shepherd
 "Got to Be There" contains a sample of "From the Beginning", as performed by Emerson, Lake & Palmer from their 1972 album Trilogy

Personnel
Credits for All I Have adapted from liner notes.

 Drum programming, keyboards, synthesizers: Rich Harrison
 Recording engineers: Jose Sanchez, Ken Schubert, Rich Harrison, Peter Wade, Nichole Cartwright
 Pro-Tools editing: Jose Sanchez, Ken Schubert, Peter Wade
 Mixing: Tony Maserati, Axel Niehaus, Angela Piva, Flip Osman, Pat Woodward
 Executive producers: Daryl Williams, Rich Harrison, Cory Rooney
 Co-executive producers: Jeff Burroughs, Ed Holmes
 A&R Management: Eugene “Geno” Brathwaite
 Photography: Jonathan Mannion
 Art direction and design: Ron Jaramillo

Charts

Weekly charts

Year-end charts

Certifications

Release history

References

External links 
 All I Have at Discogs
 Amerie: Ray of Light at Vibe

2002 debut albums
Albums produced by Rich Harrison
Amerie albums
Columbia Records albums